Mpofu is a town in Chris Hani District Municipality in the Eastern Cape province of South Africa.

As of 1996, it was the seat of a magisterial district.

References

Populated places in the Enoch Mgijima Local Municipality